James Duncan Lawrence may refer to:

James Lawrence (New Zealand cricketer)
James Duncan Lawrence (author)